The following low-power television stations broadcast on digital or analog channel 23 in the United States:

 K23AA-D in Beatrice, Nebraska
 K23BJ-D in Lake Havasu City, Arizona
 K23BV-D in Montpelier, Idaho
 K23CU-D in Prineville, Oregon
 K23DB-D in La Grande, Oregon
 K23DE-D in Childress, Texas
 K23DJ-D in Ekalaka, Montana
 K23DK-D in Meadview, Arizona
 K23DO-D in Malta, Idaho
 K23DS-D in Evanston, Wyoming
 K23DT-D in Tahoe City, California
 K23DV-D in Beryl/Modena/New, Utah
 K23DX-D in Pitkin, Colorado
 K23EX-D in Medford, Oregon
 K23FC-D in Elko, Nevada
 K23FE-D in Gallup, New Mexico
 K23FH-D in Milton-Freewater, Oregon
 K23FO-D in Jackson, Minnesota
 K23FP-D in Olivia, Minnesota
 K23FR-D in Winnemucca, Nevada
 K23FT-D in Myton, Utah
 K23FV-D in Kingman, Arizona
 K23FY-D in Frost, Minnesota
 K23FZ-D in Camp Verde, Arizona
 K23GF-D in Dove Creek, etc., Colorado
 K23GK-D in Astoria, Oregon
 K23GR-D in Preston, Idaho
 K23HT-D in St. Maries, Idaho
 K23IC-D in Huntsville, etc., Utah
 K23IS-D in Ridgecrest, etc., California
 K23IV-D in Spring Glen, Utah
 K23IX-D in Clark, etc., Wyoming
 K23IZ-D in Strong City, Oklahoma
 K23JC-D in Montezuma Creek/Aneth, Utah
 K23JD-D in Colfax, New Mexico
 K23JH-D in Leadore, Idaho
 K23JK-D in Tillamook, Oregon
 K23JN-D in Virgin, Utah
 K23JU-D in Prosser, Washington
 K23JV-D in Green River, Utah
 K23JX-D in Hatch, Utah
 K23JY-D in Huntington, Utah
 K23KC-D in Bluff, etc., Utah
 K23KD-D in Coos Bay, etc., Oregon
 K23KL-D in Farmington, New Mexico
 K23KN-D in Las Animas, Colorado
 K23KO-D in Rural Beaver County, Utah
 K23KP-D in Fishlake Resort, Utah
 K23KY-D in Council, Idaho
 K23KZ-D in Bigfork/Marcell, Minnesota
 K23LB-D in Fargo, North Dakota
 K23LE-D in Sedalia, Missouri
 K23LF-D in Eureka, Nevada
 K23LH-D in Cortez, Colorado
 K23LW-D in Emigrant, Montana
 K23LX-D in Conrad, Montana
 K23ME-D in Camas Valley, Oregon
 K23MF-D in St. James, Minnesota
 K23ML-D in Newberry Springs, California
 K23MQ-D in Duluth, Minnesota
 K23MT-D in Mexican Hat, Utah
 K23MU-D in Bridgeport, Washington
 K23MV-D in Carlsbad, New Mexico
 K23NB-D in York, Nebraska
 K23ND-D in Sayre, Oklahoma
 K23NF-D in Romeo, etc., Colorado
 K23NH-D in Seiling, Oklahoma
 K23NI-D in Crescent City, California
 K23NJ-D in Prescott, etc., Arizona
 K23NL-D in Cottonwood/Grangeville, Idaho
 K23NM-D in Sandpoint, Idaho
 K23NN-D in Las Vegas, New Mexico
 K23NP-D in Thompson Falls, Montana
 K23NQ-D in Lewiston, Idaho
 K23NR-D in Mount Pleasant, Utah
 K23NS-D in Rockaway Beach, Oregon
 K23NT-D in Mayfield, Utah
 K23NU-D in Richfield, etc., Utah
 K23NV-D in Summit County, Utah
 K23NW-D in Montrose, Colorado
 K23NX-D in Gateway, Colorado
 K23NY-D in St. George, Utah
 K23OA-D in Kanarraville, Utah
 K23OD-D in Scipio, Utah
 K23OE-D in Kasilof, Alaska
 K23OH-D in Orangeville, Utah
 K23OI-D in Tucumcari, New Mexico
 K23OK-D in Walker Lake, Nevada
 K23OM-D in Victorville, California
 K23ON-D in Lund & Preston, Nevada
 K23OO-D in Moon Ranch, New Mexico
 K23OR-D in Pagosa Springs, Colorado
 K23OS-D in London Springs, Oregon
 K23OT-D in Juliaetta, Idaho
 K23OU-D in Pueblo, Colorado
 K23OV-D in Hood River, Oregon
 K23OW-D in Hot Springs, Arkansas
 K23OX-D in Holyoke, Colorado
 K23PA-D in Klamath Falls, Oregon
 K23PL-D in Shonto, Arizona
 K23PN-D in La Pine, Oregon
 K23PU-D in Norfolk, Nebraska
 K38CZ-D in Lincoln City/Newport, Oregon
 K40LH-D in Orderville, Utah
 K50KK-D in Ellensburg, Washington
 KAGS-LD in Bryan, Texas
 KCDN-LD in Kansas City, Missouri
 KCDO-TV (DRT) in Kimball, Nebraska
 KCTU-LD in Wichita, Kansas
 KCWT-CD in La Feria, Texas
 KDGL-LD in Sublette, Kansas
 KEVN-LD in Rapid City, South Dakota
 KEVU-CD in Eugene, Oregon
 KEZI in Elkton, Oregon
 KFUL-LD in San Luis Obispo, California
 KGSA-LD in San Antonio, Texas
 KGWZ-LD in Portland, Oregon
 KIMG-LD in Ventura, California
 KKIF-LD in Twin Falls, Idaho
 KLVD-LD in Las Vegas, Nevada
 KMUV-LD in Monterey, California
 KNCD-LD in Nacogdoches, Texas
 KONV-LD in Canton, Ohio
 KPDD-LD in Evergreen, Colorado
 KQDA-LD in Denison, Texas
 KQEG-CA in La Crescent, Minnesota
 KRDT-CD in Redding, California
 KSCZ-LD in San Jose-San Francisco, California
 KSMV-LD in Los Angeles, California
 KSNL-LD in Salina, Kansas
 KSXF-LD in Sioux Falls, South Dakota
 KTPE-LD in Kansas City, Missouri
 KTUO-LD in Tulsa, Oklahoma
 KTVP-LD in Phoenix, Arizona
 KTVS-LD in Albuquerque, New Mexico
 KVCV-LD in Victoria, Texas
 W23BV-D in Evansville, Indiana
 W23BW-D in Madison, Wisconsin
 W23DM-D in Falmouth, Kentucky
 W23DR-D in Romney, West Virginia, to move to channel 21
 W23EB-D in Cadillac, Michigan
 W23EQ-D in Danville, Illinois
 W23ER-D in Poughkeepsie, New York
 W23ES-D in Marshall, North Carolina
 W23EU-D in Rutland, Vermont
 W23EV-D in Carrollton, Georgia
 W23EW-D in Springfield, Illinois
 W23EX-D in Sussex, New Jersey
 W23EY-D in Canton, North Carolina
 W23EZ-D in Sylva, North Carolina
 W23FC-D in Eau Claire, Wisconsin
 W23FH-D in Erie, Pennsylvania
 W23FI-D in Valdosta, Georgia
 W23FJ-D in Jennings, Florida
 W23FL-D in Traverse City, Michigan
 W23FN-D in Albany, Georgia
 WAAU-LD in Augusta, Georgia
 WAPW-CD in Abingdon, etc., Virginia
 WAUA-LD in Columbus, Georgia
 WNGT-CD in Smithfield-Selma, North Carolina, an ATSC 3.0 station
 WBXZ-LD in Buffalo, New York
 WCUH-LD in Fort Wayne, Indiana
 WDDN-LD in Washington, D.C.
 WDMR-LD in Springfield, Massachusetts
 WDWA-LD in Dale City, Virginia, to move to channel 29
 WFBN-LD in Rockford, Illinois
 WHPM-LD in Hattiesburg, Mississippi
 WHSU-CD in Syracuse, New York
 WITD-CD in Chesapeake, Virginia
 WJDE-CD in Nashville, Tennessee
 WJDG-LD in Grundy, Virginia
 WKTB-CD in Norcross, Georgia
 WMDV-LD in Danville, Virginia
 WMJF-CD in Towson, Maryland
 WOIL-CD in Talladega, Alabama
 WQAP-LD in Montgomery, Alabama
 WQSJ-CD in Quebradillas, Puerto Rico
 WRGX-LD in Dothan, Alabama
 WSVT-LD in Tampa, Florida
 WTAS-LD in Waukesha, Wisconsin
 WUNC-TV (DRT) in Oxford, North Carolina
 WVUA-CD in Tuscaloosa/Northport, Alabama
 WXDT-LP in Naples, Florida
 WXNY-LD in New York, New York
 WZPJ-LD in Bennington, Vermont
 WZVC-LD in Athens, Georgia

The following low-power stations, which are no longer licensed, formerly broadcast on digital or analog channel 23:
 K23BP in Daggett, etc., California
 K23CL in Lompoc, California
 K23EC-D in Canadian, Texas
 K23FU in Kennewick & Pasco, Washington
 K23GW in Price, Utah
 K23HB in Flagstaff, Arizona
 K23HI in Billings, Montana
 K23IA in San Angelo, Texas
 K23KV-D in Austin, Nevada
 K23LK-D in Modesto, California
 K23NZ-D in Three Forks, Montana
 KAZS-LP in South Sioux City, Nebraska
 KHMM-CD in Hanford, California
 KJEP-LP in Nashville, Arkansas
 W23AQ in Lake City, Florida
 W23AZ in Hackettstown, New Jersey
 W23BC in Jackson, Mississippi
 W23BQ in Asheville, etc., North Carolina
 W23CX in Salisbury, Maryland
 WIEK-LD in Midland, Michigan
 WLDW-LD in Myrtle Beach, South Carolina
 WODX-LD in Springfield, Illinois
 WQDU-LD in Albany, Georgia
 WSTY-LP in Hammond, Louisiana
 WTSD-CD in Philadelphia, Pennsylvania
 WUEA-LD in Lafayette, Indiana
 WUOF-LD in Gainesville, Florida

References

23 low-power